= Philip Protheroe =

Slave trader

- Died: 1763
- Occupations: Ship captain, merchant, slave trader
- Spouse: Martha Constant (married 1741)

Philip Protheroe (died 1763) was an English ship captain and slave trader.

From 1730 to 1738, Protheroe captained the Ann Snow on six trading voyages between Bristol and Africa, carrying slaves onwards to Jamaica, Virginia, and Barbados. Later he became the owner of another ship, the Tryal, carrying slaves to the colonies on six additional voyages between 1747 and 1759. Protheroe was involved in the trade of over 2800 slaves during his lifetime. He died in 1763, leaving no children.
